Robert Baron may refer to:

Robert Baron (theologian) (1596–1639), Scottish theologian
Robert A. Baron (born 1943), American psychologist
Robert Baron (poet) (1630–?), English poet and dramatist

See also

Robert Barron (disambiguation)